Bholoo Shah or Bholu Shah also called Shah Behlan and Bhollo Shah was an 18th-century Muslim Sufi saint from Delhi, India. He was a Majzoob who belonged to the Qadri order. His dargah (mausoleum) is in Old Delhi, India.

Biography
Most writers maintain that Bholoo Shah’s birthplace to be Punjab. This was before the partition of the Indian subcontinent when the Mughal era was on the rise.
He migrated to Delhi from Punjab leaving his family behind. In Delhi, he got beneficence from Shah Abdul Hameed and became his spiritual successor.
Shah Mohammad Hafeez became his khalifah and shrine supervisor. After he died, his son took this responsibility. Their shrines are also near the shrine of Bholoo Shah.

One account states that he was the disciple and khalifah of Abdul Hamid in Qadri order while some scholars opine that he was the disciple and khalifah of Shah Abdul Hameed in Qadri Razzaqi Order and also enjoyed the company of Shah Nano and Shah Fakhr-ud-Din Chishti.

Tomb
The dargah (mausoleum or shrine) is at the Kabuli Darwaza (west side of the Red Fort and should not be confused with Khooni Darwaza) in Old Delhi, India as verified by the first book on the shrines of Delhi, "Mazaraat-e-Auliya-e-Delhi".
The shrine of Bholoo Shah which used to be in Kabuli darwaza has now been removed but only its remains are visible. Nearby is the shrine of his disciple Shah Mohammad Hafeez and his son Shah Ghulam Mohammad is also buried nearby. 
Some sources cite that Bholoo Shah died on the 20th Moharram 1024 AH or 10 October 1789 CE and his shrine along with a mosque enclosure is near the railway line, under the left side of the Mithai Bridge (Lahori Gate 4, Old Delhi 6). His khalifah Shah Hafeez-ur-Rehman is buried nearby who died on the 30th Ziquad 1236 AH 28 August 1821 CE during the reign of Akbar Shah II (1806–1837). Shah Hafeez-ur-Rehman’s son and khalifah Shah Ghulam Mohammad is buried at his feet.
His annual Urs is held annually on 19th of Muharram. His devotees also celebrate basant in the spring season at his shrine with great enthusiasm.

References

Further reading
 Delhi, the emperor's city: rediscovering Chandni Chowk and its environs, by Vijay Goel. Lustre Press, 2003. .
 
  
  
 "Tareekh Mashaikh Qadria Vol III " by Dr Ghulam Yahya Anjum; Kutb Khana Amjadia 425 Matia Mahal Jama Mosque, Delhi-6, India, 2002
 Mazaraat-e-Auliya-e-Delhi, by Shah Alam Afridi; 1922, Delhi, India.
 Mazaraat-e-Auliya-e-Delhi, by Dr Hifz-ur-Rehman Siddiqui; 2006, Farid Book Depot (Pvt) Ltd, Pataudi House Darya Gunj, New Delhi-2, India.
 Rehnuma-e-Mazaraat Delhi Sharif, by Mohammad Asim Al-Qadri Sunbhli; Muhammadi Book Depot, 523 Waheed Kutb Market Matia Mahal Jamai Mosque, Delhi-6, India, 2007.

1789 deaths
Indian Sufi saints
People from Delhi
Year of birth uncertain